Nagarzê is a township and seat of Nagarzê County in the Tibet Autonomous Region of China. It lies at an altitude of 4452 metres (14,609 feet).

See also
List of towns and villages in Tibet

Populated places in Shannan, Tibet
Nagarzê County